OpenMicroBlogging is a deprecated protocol that allows different microblogging services to inter-operate. It lets the user of one service subscribe to notices by a user of another service. This enables a federation of new communities, as potentially an organization of any size can host a service. OpenMicroBlogging utilizes the OAuth and Yadis protocols and does not depend on any central authority.

OpenMicroBlogging has been superseded by an enhanced version of it, OStatus.

History

The first implementation of the OpenMicroBlogging protocol is the Laconica software, which changed name to StatusNet in August 2009. Identi.ca is the first service to support OpenMicroBlogging, and other sizeable services including Leo Laporte's Twit Army at https://web.archive.org/web/20080826063959/http://army.twit.tv/ were amongst those powered by the open source StatusNet.

Since March 2009 one can search users' accounts in Twit Army from within Identi.ca. You could also subscribe to accounts at Twit Army from your Identi.ca account.

The second implementation of the OpenMicroBlogging protocol is the OpenMicroBlogger software.

See also 
 ActivityPub
 OStatus
 Microblogging
 Comparison of microblogging services

External links

Implementations:
OpenMicroBlogger

Services
List of Independent StatusNet Instances
List of OpenMicroBlogger installations

References

Microblogging software
Free software